Meridarchis drachmophora is a moth in the Carposinidae family. It was described by Alexey Diakonoff in 1950. It is found in New Guinea.

This species has a wingspan of 32 mm. The forewings are glossy ochreous, densely scattered with brown.

References

Natural History Museum Lepidoptera generic names catalog

Carposinidae
Moths described in 1950